Walter Floyd ("Jack") Pratt Jr. (born 1946) was the Educational Foundation Distinguished Professor at the University of South Carolina School of Law, where he served as dean from 2006 to 2011. Pratt's research focus is legal history, contracts and commercial law.

Biography
Pratt was born and raised in Jackson, Mississippi. He studied at Vanderbilt University, and graduated with a B.A. in History magna cum laude in 1968. After serving three years as an officer in the United States Army, he was a Rhodes Scholar and in 1974 he obtained a  D.Phil. in Politics from Balliol College, Oxford University. In 1977, received a J.D. from Yale Law School, where he served as an editor of the Yale Law Journal.

After graduation, he was law clerk for Judge Charles Clark of the United States Court of Appeals for the Fifth Circuit and then for Chief Justice Warren E. Burger of the Supreme Court of the United States during the 1978–1979 Term.

In 1979, he joined the faculty as an assistant professor of Duke University Law School and in 1982 was promoted to an associate professor. In the 1984-1985 academic year he was a visiting professor at the J. Reuben Clark Law School. In 1986, he moved to the faculty of the University of Notre Dame Law School, and in 1998 was named a full professor. There, he played several executive roles including Associate Dean for Academic Affairs and later Executive Associate Dean.

On July 1, 2006, Pratt was named dean and Educational Foundation Distinguished Professor of the University of South Carolina School of Law. In 2011, he announced he would not seek an extension of his five year term. After stepping down as dean, he has continued to teach at the Law School.

Personal life
He is married to Dorothy Overstreet Pratt, a history professor and author, whom he met as an undergraduate at Vanderbilt, and they have two sons.

See also 
 List of law clerks of the Supreme Court of the United States (Chief Justice)

References

Selected publications

Books
 
 
  Amazon audiobook.

Articles

Book reviews

External links
 Bio, University of South Carolina School of Law
 Portrait, University of South Carolina School of Law
 Bio University of Notre Dame School of Law

Living people
1946 births
Vanderbilt University alumni
American Rhodes Scholars
Alumni of Balliol College, Oxford
Yale Law School alumni
Law clerks of the Supreme Court of the United States
Duke University School of Law faculty
University of Notre Dame faculty
University of South Carolina faculty
Deans of law schools in the United States
United States Army officers
American legal scholars
Legal historians